When Lizzie Got Her Polish is a 1914 Canadian comedy short silent black and white film directed by Al Christie and produced by Nestor Film Company. It is based on the story by Bess Meredyth.

Cast
 Victoria Forde as Lizzie
 Eddie Lyons as Jim
 Bess Meredyth as Bess
 Lee Moran as Lee Moran

References

External links
 

Canadian comedy short films
1914 comedy films
1914 films
1914 short films
Canadian silent short films
Canadian black-and-white films
Films directed by Al Christie
Films with screenplays by Bess Meredyth
Universal Pictures short films
1910s Canadian films
Silent comedy films